This topic covers notable events and articles related to 2021 in music

Specific locations

African music
American music
Asian music
Australian music
Brazilian music
British music 
Canadian music
Chinese music
Czech music
Danish music
European music
Finnish music
French music
German music
Icelandic music
Indian music 
Indonesian music
Irish music
Italian music
Japanese music
Latin music
Malaysian music
Mongolian music
Norwegian music
Philippine music
Polynesian music 
Scandinavian music
South Korean music
Swedish music
Taiwanese music
Vietnamese music

Specific genres

Classical
Country
Electronic
Jazz
Latin
Heavy Metal
Hip Hop
Rock

Albums released

Awards

Bands formed

 ≠Me
 Alamat
 ASP
 Be First
 BGYO
 Bini
 Billlie
 Blitzers
 BugAboo
 Ciipher
 Epex
 Ho6la 
 Hot Issue
 Ichillin'
 INI
 Ive
 Just B
 KAIA
 Kingdom
 Lightsum
 Luminous
 Lovejoy
 Mirae
 The Morris Springfield Project
 Naniwa Danshi
 NTX
 Omega X
 Pixy
 Purple Kiss
 Silk Sonic
 The Smile
 T1419
 Tri.be
 Xdinary Heroes
 WJSN The Black

Soloist debuts

 Adora
 Addison Rae
 Ai Hashimoto
 Aguri Ōnishi
 Angela Ken
 Angelina Jordan
 Ayuni D
 BamBam
 Bella Poarch
 Belle Mariano
 Blaster
 Chlöe
 Diarra Sylla
 D.O.
 Do Han-se
 Edan Lui
 Elaiza Ikeda
 El Noba
 Gayle
 Gigi De Lana
 Hiroki Moriuchi
 I.M
 IShowSpeed
 Jay B
 Jinyoung
 Jo Yu-ri
 Joao Constancia
 Joy
 Kwon Eun-bi
 L
 Lee Seung-hyub
 Lili
 Lisa
 Luke Hemmings
 Lyca Gairanod
 Marika Kouno
 Masato Hayakawa
 Miyu Honda
 Nathan Evans
 Nicholas Hamilton
 Olivia Rodrigo
 Park So-yeon
 PinkPantheress
 Reina Kondō
 Rie Takahashi
 Rosé
 Sorn
 Takanori Iwata
 Takuya Eguchi
 Wendy
 Young K
 Youngjae
 Yugyeom
 Yuqi

Bands reformed

 Big Time Rush
 The Boo Radleys
 Defleshed
 Ellis, Beggs & Howard
 Faces
 Gang of Four
 Macklemore & Ryan Lewis
 New Radicals
 Mudvayne
 No Angels
 Porcupine Tree
 Shadows Fall
 TO1

Bands on hiatus
 ALI
 Dogleg
 Got7
 Kariyushi58
 Lovelyz
 Silent Siren
 Suchmos
 Tokyo Performance Doll

Bands disbanded

 100%
 1Team
 AŌP
 Ayumikurikamaki
 Beach Slang
 Berry Good
 Blackalicious
 Blu-Billion
 Brand X
 Butterfly Child
 Cabaret Voltaire
 Cellchrome
 Los Chunguitos 
 Commander Cody and His Lost Planet Airmen
 CY8ER
 Chromatics
 Daft Punk
 Datblygu
 Demons & Wizards
 Desurabbits
 The Fat Boys
 GFriend
 Golden Earring
 Hollywood Monsters
 Iris
 Iz*One
 Maison Book Girl
 MKTO
 The Monkees
 Omega
 OnePixcel
 Ought
 Pink Cres.
 The Posies
 Poco
 Potty Mouth
 The Preatures
 Rascal Flatts
 Return to Forever
 Sakura Gakuin
 SGO48
 Sly and Robbie
 Stereo Total
 Tenth Avenue North
 Thao & the Get Down Stay Down
 V6
 Yuck

Deaths

January
 1 
 Carlos do Carmo, 81, Portuguese fado singer
 Misty Morgan, 75, American country music singer (Jack Blanchard & Misty Morgan)
 Liam Reilly, 65, Irish folk rock singer and keyboardist (Bagatelle)
 Jan Vering, 65, German gospel singer
 3 
 Gerry Marsden, 78, English rock singer and guitarist (Gerry and the Pacemakers)
 Warren McLean, Australian rock drummer (Machinations, I'm Talking, Divinyls)
 4 – Alexi Laiho, 41, Finnish death metal singer and guitarist (Children of Bodom) (death announced on this date)
 5 – John Georgiadis, 81, British classical violinist and conductor
 6 – Paul de Leon, 52, American metal drummer (Las Cruces)
 7 
 Deezer D, 55, American rapper and actor
 Genival Lacerda, 89, Brazilian forro singer
 Jamie O'Hara, 70, American country music singer-songwriter (The O'Kanes)
 8 
 Ed Bruce, 81, American country music singer-songwriter
 Michael Fonfara, 74, Canadian blues and rock keyboardist (The Electric Flag, Rhinoceros, Downchild Blues Band)
 Uno Loop, 91, Estonian singer and guitarist
 Elijah Moshinsky, 75, Australian opera director
 10 – Thorleif Torstensson, 71, Swedish dansband singer, guitarist and saxophonist (Thorleifs)
 11
 Howard Johnson, 79, American jazz multi-instrumentalist
 Mark Keds, 50, British pop punk singer (Senseless Things)
 Don Miller, 80, American pop singer (The Vogues)
 12 – Ron Getman, 72, American country rock guitarist and singer (The Tractors)
 13
 Tim Bogert, 76, American psychedelic rock bassist (Vanilla Fudge, Cactus, Beck, Bogert & Appice)
 Duke Bootee, 69, American rapper, producer and songwriter
 Sylvain Sylvain, 69, American glam rock guitarist (New York Dolls)
 14 
 Duranice Pace, 62, American gospel singer (The Anointed Pace Sisters)
 Larry Willoughby, 73, American country music singer-songwriter
 16 
 Jason Cope, 43, American country guitarist (The Steel Woods)
 Pave Maijanen, 70, Finnish rock keyboardist (Hurriganes, Dingo)
 Claudia Montero, 58, Argentine classical composer
 Phil Spector, 81, American record producer, pop musician (The Teddy Bears), and songwriter
 17 
 Ghulam Mustafa Khan, 89, Indian classical singer
 Junior Mance, 92, American jazz pianist
 Sammy Nestico, 96, American jazz composer and arranger
 18
 Perry Botkin Jr., 87, American composer and arranger
 Maria Koterbska, 96, Polish swing and jazz singer
 Jimmie Rodgers, 87, American pop singer
 20 – Joe Jordan, 79, American pop singer and musician (The Jordan Brothers)
 21
 Randy Parton, 67, American country music singer-songwriter
 Marc Phillips, 66, American rock singer (Hotel) and record producer
 22 
 Narendra Chanchal, 80, Indian religious singer
 Guem, 73, Algerian jazz singer
 James Purify, 76, American R&B singer (James & Bobby Purify)
 23
 Jonas Gwangwa, 83, South African jazz trombonist (The Jazz Epistles)
 Gabriel Ruiz Díaz, 45, Argentine alternative rock bassist (Catupecu Machu)
 24 – Tom Stevens, 64, American alternative country bassist (The Long Ryders)
 25 – Iron, 29, South Korean rapper
 26 
 Cara O'Sullivan, 59, Irish opera singer
 6 Dogs, 21, American rapper
 27 – Trung Kiên, 81, Vietnamese classical singer
 28
 César Isella, 82, Argentine folk singer and guitarist (Los Fronterizos)
 Sibongile Khumalo, 63, South African jazz and classical singer
 Singing Sandra, 63, Trinidadian calypso singer
 Rick Shaw, 79, American folk singer and string guitarist (The Hillside Singers)
 29 
 Ahmed Achour, 75, Tunisian classical composer and conductor
 Grady Gaines, 86, American blues saxophonist
 Jeremy Lubbock, 89, English arranger and composer
 Hilton Valentine, 77, English rock guitarist (The Animals)
 30 
 Double K, 43, American rapper (People Under the Stairs)
 Sophie, 34, Scottish electronic singer-songwriter and producer
 Alla Yoshpe, 83, Russian pop singer
 31 – Wambali Mkandawire, Malawian jazz singer

February
 1 – Temur Tsiklauri, 75, Georgian pop singer (VIA Iveria)
 2 – Aaron Wegelin, American indie rock drummer (Elf Power)
 3 
 Anne Feeney, 69, American folk singer-songwriter
 Jim Weatherly, 77, American pop and country music singer-songwriter
 4
 Stefan Cush, 60, British folk-punk singer and guitarist (The Men They Couldn't Hang) 
 Matt Harris, American power pop bassist (The Posies)
 Jessie Smith, 79, American R&B singer (The Ikettes)
 Nolan Porter, 71, American R&B singer-songwriter
 Gil Saunders, American soul singer (Harold Melvin & the Blue Notes)
 5
 Abdoul Jabbar, 40, Guinean dance singer
 Douglas Miller, 71, American gospel singer
 Örs Siklósi, 29, Hungarian metalcore singer (AWS)
 7
 Elliot Mazer, 79, American record producer and audio engineer
 Stefano Mazzonis di Pralafera, 71, Italian opera director (Opéra Royal de Wallonie)
 Ricardo Silva Elizondo, 67, Mexican pop singer
 8 
 Roza Akkuchukova, 70, Russian pop singer
 Servando Cano Rodríguez, 78, Mexican Tejano singer-songwriter
 Mary Wilson, 76, American R&B singer (The Supremes)
 9
 Chick Corea, 79, American jazz fusion keyboardist and composer (Return to Forever, Chick Corea Elektric Band)
 Cedrick Cotton, 46, American R&B singer (Ideal)
 Ghédalia Tazartès, 73, French musique concrète multi-instrumentalist
 10
 Jon Mark, 77, English pop singer-songwriter and guitarist (Mark-Almond)
 Lee Sexton, 92, American bluegrass banjoist
 11 – Joel Pina, 100, Portuguese fado guitarist (Amália Rodrigues)
 12 – Milford Graves, 79, American jazz drummer (New York Art Quartet)
 13 
 Louis Clark, 73, British symphonic rock conductor and keyboardist (Electric Light Orchestra, ELO Part II, Royal Philharmonic Orchestra)
 Sydney Devine, 81, British country and skiffle singer
 14
 Erriquez, 60, Italian folk rock singer and guitarist (Bandabardò)
 Ari Gold, 47, American R&B singer
 15
 Steuart Bedford, 81, British classical conductor and pianist
 Lucien Gourong, 77, French cabaret singer
 Andréa Guiot, 93, French opera singer
 Raymond Lévesque, 92, French chanson singer
 Johnny Pacheco, 85, Dominican salsa multi-instrumentalist (Fania All-Stars) and record producer
 16
 Carman, 65, American contemporary Christian singer
 Tonton David, 53, French reggae singer
 17 
 Françoise Cactus, 57, German indie rock singer and drummer (Stereo Total)
 Ali Hossain, 80, Bangladeshi classical composer
 U-Roy, 78, Jamaican reggae singer
 18
 Prince Markie Dee, 52, American rapper (The Fat Boys)
 Miles Seaton, 41, American indie rock singer and multi-instrumentalist (Akron / Family)
 19
 Đorđe Balašević, 67, Serbian rock singer (Rani Mraz)
 James Burke, 70, American soul singer (Five Stairsteps)
 Jerold Ottley, 86, American choral conductor (Mormon Tabernacle Choir)
 20
 Joe Burke, 81, Irish folk accordionist
 Richard Shephard, 71, British classical conductor
 Gene Taylor, 68, American rock keyboardist (The Blasters, Canned Heat, The Fabulous Thunderbirds)
 21 – Hélène Martin, 92, French chanson singer
 22 – Yalchin Rzazadeh, 74, Azerbaijani pop singer
 23 – Sean Kennedy, 35, Australian metalcore bassist (I Killed The Prom Queen, Deez Nuts)
 24 – Sardool Sikander, 60, Indian folk singer
 26 – Bob James, 68, American hard rock singer (Montrose)
 27 – Danilo Rustici, 72, Italian progressive rock guitarist (Osanna)
 28 
 Anna Kast, 39, Russian EDM singer (Little Big)
 Ian North, 68, American power pop singer and guitarist (Milk 'N' Cookies, Neo)
 Jorge Oñate, 71, Colombian vallenato singer

March
 1 – Ralph Peterson Jr., 58, American jazz drummer (Out of the Blue, The Jazz Messengers)
 2
 Chris Barber, 90, English jazz bandleader and trombonist
 Mark Goffeney, 51, American rock bassist
 Radim Pařízek, 67, Czech heavy metal drummer (Citron)
 Bunny Wailer, 73, Jamaican reggae singer and songwriter (Bob Marley and the Wailers)
 3
 Medea Abrahamyan, 88, Armenian classical cellist
 Duffy Jackson, 67, American jazz drummer
 4
 Alan Cartwright, 75, English rock bassist (Procol Harum)
 Barbara Ess, 72, American post-punk multi-instrumentalist (Y Pants, Disband)
 Helmut Winschermann, 100, German classical oboist, and conductor (Deutsche Bachsolisten)
 5
 Anna Shuttleworth, 93, British classical cellist
 Michael Stanley, 72, American rock singer-songwriter and guitarist
 7
 Sanja Ilić, 69, Serbian folk rock keyboardist (San, Balkanika)
 Josky Kiambukuta, 72, Congolese rumba singer (TPOK Jazz)
 Lars-Göran Petrov, 49, Swedish heavy metal singer and drummer (Entombed, Entombed A.D., Morbid)
 9 – James Levine, 77, American classical conductor and pianist (Metropolitan Opera)
 8
 Adrian Bărar, 61, Romanian heavy metal guitarist and composer (Cargo)
 James Mac Gaw, French progressive rock guitarist (Magma)
 11 
 Ray Campi, 86, American rockabilly musician
 Jewlia Eisenberg, 50, American avant-rock singer (Charming Hostess)
 Florentín Giménez, 95, Paraguayan classical and folk pianist
 12 – Maximiliano Djerfy, 46, Argentine alternative rock guitarist (Callejeros)
 14 
 Eulalio Cervantes, 52, Mexican rock saxophonist (Maldita Vecindad)
 Reggie Warren, 52, American R&B singer (Troop)
 15
 Dragoljub Đuričić, 58, Serbian rock and jazz drummer (YU Grupa, Kerber, Leb i sol)
 Doug Parkinson, 74, Australian pop and jazz singer (Fanny Adams, The Life Organisation)
 16 – Bill Irvine, 87, American rock and roll pianist (Chuck Alaimo Quartet)
 17 
 Matt Miller, 34, American indie rock keyboardist (Titus Andronicus)
 Freddie Redd, 92, American jazz keyboardist
 Corey Steger, 42, American metalcore guitarist (Underoath)
 18 – Paul Jackson, 73, American jazz fusion bassist (The Headhunters, Azteca)
 19 
 Cristián Cuturrufo, 48, Chilean jazz trumpeter
 Gary Leib, 65, American new wave keyboardist (Rubber Rodeo)
 20
 Constance Demby, 81, American new age keyboardist and dulcimer player
 Taryn Fiebig, 49, Australian opera singer
 Yevgeny Nesterenko, 83, Russian opera singer
 Dan Sartain, 39, American garage rock and rockabilly singer-songwriter
 23 
 Don Heffington, 70, American roots rock drummer (Lone Justice, Watkins Family Hour)
 Hana Hegerová, 89, Slovak chanson singer
 Peter Viskinde, 67, Danish rock guitarist (Malurt, Big Fat Snake)
 25 – Tavish Maloney, 24, American emo guitarist (Oso Oso)
 26 – Brett Bradshaw, 50, American glam metal drummer (Faster Pussycat)
 28 – Malcolm Cecil, 84, British jazz bassist and synthesizer player (Tonto's Expanding Head Band, Blues Incorporated, The Jazz Couriers)
 29
 Jerry Burgan, 76, American folk rock guitarist (We Five)
 Hans Kinds, 74, Dutch blues rock guitarist (Cuby + Blizzards)
 30 – Willie Schofield, 81, American R&B singer-songwriter (The Falcons)
 31
 Anzor Erkomaishvili, 80, Georgian folk singer
 Jadwiga Wysoczanská, 93, Czech opera singer

April
 1 – Tony Pola, Australian blues-rock drummer (Beasts of Bourbon, Kim Salmon and the Surrealists)
 2
 Shaukat Ali, 76, Pakistani folk singer
 Morris "B.B." Dickerson, 71, American funk bassist and singer (War)
 Gabi Luncă, 82, Romanian lăutărească singer
 Nelu Ploieşteanu, 70, Romanian lăutărească singer
 3
 Earl Bulinski, 72, American rock musician (The Electras)
 Jill Corey, 85, American pop singer
 4 – Paul Humphrey, 60, Canadian new wave singer (Blue Peter)
 5 
 Haja El Hamdaouia, 91, Moroccan aita and chaabi singer 
 Krzysztof Krawczyk, 74, Polish pop singer and composer
 6 – Predrag Živković Tozovac, 85, Serbian folk singer
 9 – DMX, 50, American rapper
 10 
 Shay Healy, 78, Irish pop songwriter
 Bob Petric, American indie rock guitarist (Thomas Jefferson Slave Apartments)
 Bosse Skoglund, 85, Swedish blues drummer
 11 
 Mita Haque, 58, Bangladeshi Rabindra Sagreet singer
 Zoran Simjanović, 74, Serbian classical composer and rock keyboardist (Siluete, Elipse)
 13
 Farid Ahmed, 66, Bangladeshi film composer
 Leonid Bortkevich, 71, Belarusian folk rock singer (Pesniary)
 Rocco Filippini, 77, Swiss classical cellist
 14
 Michel Louvain, 83, Canadian pop singer
 Rusty Young, 75, American country rock singer-songwriter and guitarist (Poco)
 15 – Barby Kelly, 45, Spanish-born German folk singer (The Kelly Family)
 16
 Barry Mason, 85, British pop songwriter 
 Mike Mitchell, 77, American rock guitarist (The Kingsmen)
 17 – Black Rob, 52, American rapper
 18
 Lew Lewis, British pub rock harmonica player (Eddie and the Hot Rods)
 Paul Oscher, 71, American blues singer
 Lars Ranzenberger, 53, German-born Spanish power metal bassist (Metalium)
 19 – Jim Steinman, 73, American rock lyricist, composer, pianist, and record producer
 20 – Les McKeown, 65, Scottish pop rock singer (Bay City Rollers)
 21 
 Lea Dali Lion, 47, Estonian pop singer
 Joe Long, 88, American pop rock bassist (The Four Seasons)
 22 – Shock G, 57, American rapper (Digital Underground)
 23
 Fredi, 78, Finnish novelty pop singer
 Milva, 81, Italian pop singer
 25 
 Denny Freeman, 76, American blues guitarist
 Rajan Mishra, 70, Indian khyal sarangi player (Rajan and Sajan Mishra)
 27 – Paul Couter, 72, Belgian rock guitarist (TC Matic)
 28 
 Toni Dalli, 87, Italian pop singer
 Anita Lane, 61, Australian alternative rock singer-songwriter (Nick Cave and the Bad Seeds)
 Liuwe Tamminga, 67, Dutch classical harpsichordist and organist
 29 
 Johnny Crawford, 75, American pop singer
 John Hinch, 73, British heavy metal drummer (Judas Priest, Bakerloo)
 Tony Markellis, 68, American jam band bassist (Trey Anastasio Band)
 Will Mecum, 48, American stoner rock guitarist (Karma to Burn, Year Long Disaster)
 30
 John Dee Holeman, 92, American blues guitarist
 Anthony Payne, 84, British classical composer
 Ray Reyes, 51, Puerto Rican pop singer (Menudo, El Reencuentro)

May
 1
 Debu Chaudhuri, 85, Indian classical sitarist
 Wondress Hutchinson, 56, American dance singer (Mantronix)
 2 – Tommy West, 78, American music producer and pop singer-songwriter (Cashman & West)
 3
 Phil Naro, 63, American hard rock singer (Talas)
 Lloyd Price, 88, American R&B singer-songwriter
 4 
 Rodolfo García, 75, Argentine psychedelic rock drummer (Almendra, Aquelarre)
 Nick Kamen, 59, English pop singer-songwriter
 Genji Kuniyoshi, 90, Japanese folk singer
 6
 Comagan, 48, Indian playback singer
 Vanya Kostova, 64, Bulgarian pop singer (Tonika)
 Prem Dhoj Pradhan, 82, Nepali pop singer and guitarist
 Pervis Staples, 85, American gospel singer (The Staple Singers)
 7 
 G. Anand, 67, Indian playback singer
 Vanraj Bhatia, 93, Indian film composer
 Cassiano, 77, Brazilian funk and soul singer-songwriter
 8 – Curtis Fuller, 86, American jazz trombonist (The Jazz Messengers)
 10 
 Svante Thuresson, 68, Swedish jazz and schlager singer (Gals and Pals)
 Pauline Tinsley, 93, British opera singer
 12 – Maran, 48, Indian gaana singer
 13 
 Norman Simmons, 91, American jazz pianist and arranger
 Jack Terricloth, 50, American dark cabaret singer (The World/Inferno Friendship Society)
 Bill Tsamis, 60, American metal guitarist (Warlord)
 14 – Ester Mägi, 99, Estonian classical composer
 15 
 Đorđe Marjanović, 89, Serbian schlager and pop singer
 Mario Pavone, 80, American jazz bassist
 16 
 Patsy Bruce, 81, American country songwriter
 MC Kevin, 23, Brazilian funk carioca singer
 17 
 Nicolas Ker, 50, French electronic singer (Poni Hoax)
 Neal Ford, 78, American psychedelic rock singer (Neal Ford and the Fanatics)
 Amarendra Mohanty, 63, Indian film composer and singer
 18 – Franco Battiato, 76, Italian progressive rock and new wave singer-songwriter
 19 
 Johnny Ashcroft, 94, Australian country and folk singer-songwriter
 Alix Dobkin, 80, American folk singer-songwriter and guitarist
 Martin Turnovský, 92, Czech classical conductor
 20 – Roger Hawkins, 75, American rock and soul drummer (Muscle Shoals Rhythm Section)
 22 – Glenn Douglas Tubb, 85, American country singer-songwriter
 23 
 Dewayne Blackwell, 84, American country songwriter
 Lorrae Desmond, 93, Australian cabaret singer and actress
 24 
 John Davis, 66, American dance pop singer (Milli Vanilli)
 Samuel E. Wright, 74, American pop singer and actor
 25 – Søren Holm, 25, Danish indie pop singer (Liss)
 26 – Patrick Sky, 80, American folk singer-songwriter
 27 
 Tiit Haagma, 67, Estonian progressive rock bassist (Ruja)
 Shantiraj Khosla, 54, Indian film composer and singer
 Nelson Sargento, 96, Brazilian samba singer
 28 
 Zohra Abdullayeva, 68, Azerbaijani mugham singer 
 Jimi Bellmartin, 71, Indonesian-born Dutch funk singer
 29 
 B. J. Thomas, 78, American pop singer
 Johnny Trudell, 82, American jazz trumpeter
 31 - Lil Loaded, 20, American rapper

June
 3 – Karla Burns, 66, American opera singer
 6 – Michele Merlo, 28, Italian pop singer-songwriter
 7 – David C. Lewis, American soft rock and new age keyboardist (Ambrosia, Shadowfax)
 8
 Farhad Humayun, 42, Pakistani psychedelic rock drummer and singer (Overload)
 Dean Parrish, 78, American soul singer
 9 – Juan Nelson, 62, American blues rock bassist (Ben Harper and the Innocent Criminals)
 10 – Fran McKendree, 74, American folk rock singer-songwriter and guitarist (McKendree Spring)
 11 
 Heribert Beissel, 88, German classical composer
 Jon Lukas, 72, Maltese pop singer
 14 – Selçuk Tekay, 68, Turkish classical composer and violinist
 16 – Novica Zdravković, 73, Serbian folk singer
 17 – Fane Flaws, 70, New Zealand rock guitarist (The Crocodiles, The Spats, Blerta)
 18 
 Gift of Gab, 50, American rapper (Blackalicious)
 Takeshi Terauchi, 82, Japanese surf rock guitarist
 20 
 Jeanne Lamon, 71, American-Canadian classical violinist and conductor
 Lionel Leroy, 65, French pop singer
 Gianna Rolandi, 68, American opera singer
 21
 Nobuo Hara, 94, Japanese jazz saxophonist
 Mamady Keïta, 70, Guinean djembe player
 Pat Lupo, 66, American rock bassist (John Cafferty and the Beaver Brown Band)
 22 – Parassala B. Ponnammal, 96, Indian Carnatic singer
 23 
 David Edwards, 56, Welsh post-punk singer (Datblygu)
 Ellen McIlwaine, 75, American-Canadian psychedelic rock and blues singer and slide guitarist (Fear Itself)
 Peter Zinovieff, 88, British electronic composer and founder of Electronic Music Studios
 25 
 Rinaldo Rafanelli, 71, Argentine psychedelic rock singer (Color Humano, Sui Generis)
 Wes, 57, Cameroonian world music singer
 26
 Jon Hassell, 84, American jazz trumpeter
 Frederic Rzewski, 83, American classical pianist and composer
 Johnny Solinger, 55, American hard rock singer (Skid Row)
 27
 Willy Crook, 55, Argentine new wave saxophonist (Patricio Rey y sus Redonditos de Ricota)
 Peps Persson, 74, Swedish blues and reggae singer 
 28 
 Burton Greene, 84, American free jazz pianist
 Paul Koulak, 78, French television composer
 29
 John Lawton, 74, British rock singer (Uriah Heep, Lucifer's Friend, Les Humphries Singers)
 Bryan St. Pere, 53, American alternative rock drummer (Hum)

July
 1
 Louis Andriessen, 82, Dutch classical composer
 Steve Kekana, 62, South African soul and Mbaqanga singer
 4
 Sanford Clark, 85, American rockabilly singer
 Rick Laird, 80, Irish jazz fusion bassist (Mahavishnu Orchestra, Brian Auger and the Trinity)
 5 – Raffaella Carrà, 78, Italian pop singer
 6 – David King, American alternative rock guitarist (Mary's Danish)
 9 – Andy Williams, 49, American Christian rock drummer (Casting Crowns)
 10
 Barbara Allbut, 80, American pop singer (The Angels)
 Byron Berline, 77, American bluegrass fiddler
 Chris Hutka, American post-hardcore singer (The Bunny the Bear)
 11 
 Juini Booth, 73, American jazz bassist (The Sun Ra Arkestra)
 Sound Sultan, 44, Nigerian rapper
 13 – Brother Resistance, 67, Trinidadian rhythm poet
 14 
 Gary Corbett, American blues rock keyboardist (Cinderella)
 Jeff LaBar, 58, American glam metal and blues rock guitarist (Cinderella)
 15 
 Joe Cassidy, Irish indie pop singer-songwriter (Butterfly Child)
 Boris Goryachev, 49, Russian a capella singer (Turetsky Choir Art Group)
 Pyotr Mamonov, 70, Russian alternative rock singer-songwriter (Zvuki Mu)
 Tsepo Tshola, 67, Mosotho afro-jazz singer (Sankomota)
 16 – Biz Markie, 57, American rapper
 17 
 Dolores Claman, 94, Canadian television composer and pianist
 Robby Steinhardt, 71, American progressive rock singer and violinist (Kansas)
 Graham Vick, 67, English opera director
 19 
 Tolis Voskopoulos, 80, Greek laïko singer
 Chuck E. Weiss, 76, American blues rock singer-songwriter
 20 – Jerry Granelli, 80, American-born Canadian jazz drummer
 21 
Tõnu Aare, 67, Estonian rock singer and multi-instrumentalist (Apelsin)
Clarence McDonald, 76, American pianist, composer, arranger, and producer
 22 
 Pavel Pelc, 71, Czech art rock bassist and singer (Progres 2)
 Peter Rehberg, 53, Austrian-British electronic musician (KTL) and founder of Mego
 23
 Fakir Alamgir, 71, Bangladeshi folk singer
 Wally Gonzales, 71, Filipino blues rock guitarist (Juan de la Cruz Band)
 25 – Count M'Butu, 75-76, American blues-rock percussionist (The Derek Trucks Band) (death announced on this date)
 26
 Mike Howe, 55, American heavy metal singer (Metal Church, Heretic)
 Joey Jordison, 46, American heavy metal drummer and guitarist (Slipknot, Murderdolls, Scar the Martyr, Sinsaenum)
 27 
 Dusty Hill, 72, American blues rock bassist and singer (ZZ Top)
 Willie Winfield, 91, American doo-wop singer (The Harptones)
 28
 Giuseppe Giacomini, 80, Italian opera singer
 Shahram Kashani, 47, Iranian pop singer
 Johnny Ventura, 81, Dominican salsa and merengue singer
 29 – Gonzoe, 45, American rapper (Kausion)
 30 – Jacob Desvarieux, 65, Guadeloupean-French zouk singer
 31 – Jerzy Matuszkiewicz, 93, Polish jazz saxophonist

August
 1 
 Paul Cotton, 78, American country rock singer-songwriter and guitarist (Poco, Illinois Speed Press)
 Kazimierz Kowalski, 70, Polish opera singer
 3
 Kelli Hand, 56, American techno DJ
 Allan Stephenson, 71, British classical cellist and composer
 4 
 Razzy Bailey, 82, American country singer
 Jean "Binta" Breeze, 65, Jamaican dub poet
 Paul Johnson, 50, American house DJ
 Stan Lark, 81, American rock and roll bassist (The Fireballs)
 Anders Pettersson, 69, Swedish dansband keyboardist (Lasse Stefanz)
 6 
 Les Vandyke, 90, British pop songwriter
 Wang Wenjuan, 94, Chinese yue opera singer
 7 – Dennis Thomas, 70, American funk saxophonist (Kool & The Gang)
 9
 Joey Ambrose, 87, American rock and roll saxophonist (Bill Haley & His Comets)
 Killer Kau, 23, South African rapper
 Mpura, 26, South African rapper
 Chucky Thompson, 53, American record producer
 11 
 Mike Finnigan, 76, American rock and jazz keyboardist
 Roy Gaines, 83, American electric blues guitarist
 Caroline Peyton, 69, American folk singer-songwriter
 12 – Ronnell Bright, 91, American jazz pianist
 13
 Baba Zumbi, 49, American rapper (Zion I)
 Nanci Griffith, 68, American folk singer-songwriter
 Pil Trafa, 62, Argentine punk rock singer (Los Violadores)
 14 – R. Murray Schafer, 88, Canadian avant-garde classical composer
 15 – Jagjit Kaur, 91, Indian playback singer
 16 – Hormoz Farhat, 93, Iranian-American classical composer
 17 – Squeak, 26, American hip hop producer (Pivot Gang)
 20
 Tom T. Hall, 85, American country singer-songwriter
 Larry Harlow, 82, American salsa keyboardist (Fania All-Stars)
 Peter Ind, 93, British jazz bassist
 Michael Morgan, 64, American classical conductor
 21 
 Bill Emerson, 83, American bluegrass banjoist
 Don Everly, 84, American country-rock and roll singer and songwriter (The Everly Brothers)
 22 
 Charles Burles, 85, French opera singer
 Bob Fish, 72, British doo-wop singer (Darts)
 Brian Travers, 62, British pop and reggae saxophonist and songwriter (UB40)
 Eric Wagner, 62, American doom metal singer (Trouble, The Skull)
 23
 Fritz McIntyre, 62, British pop keyboardist (Simply Red)
 Olli Wisdom, 63, British goth rock singer (Specimen) and Goa trance producer
 24
 Pierre Dutot, 75, French classical trumpeter
 Charlie Watts, 80, English rock drummer (The Rolling Stones)
 25 – Dave Harper, British indie rock drummer (Frankie & The Heartstrings)
 26 – Kenny Malone, 83, American country drummer
 27 – Siegfried Matthus, 87, German composer and conductor
 29 
 Ron Bushy, 79, American psychedelic rock drummer (Iron Butterfly)
 John Drake, 74, American rock singer (The Amboy Dukes)
 Lee "Scratch" Perry, 85, Jamaican reggae singer-songwriter and producer
 30 – Lee Williams, 75, American gospel singer (Lee Williams and the Spiritual QC's)
 31 – Nobesuthu Mbadu, 76, South African mbaqanga singer (Mahotella Queens)

September
 1
 Adalberto Álvarez, 72, Cuban son pianist (Son 14, Adalberto Álvarez y su Son)
 Carol Fran, 87, American soul blues singer and pianist
 Marty Fried, 77, American rock drummer (The Cyrkle)
 Aleksandr Khrabunov, 61, Russian rock guitarist (Zoopark)
 2
 Alemayehu Eshete, 80, Ethiopian jazz singer
 MadClip, 34, Greek-American rapper
 Mikis Theodorakis, 96, Greek classical and film composer
 4 
 Billy Cafaro, 84, Argentine rock singer
 Gerhard Erber, 86, German classical pianist
 5
 Rickie Lee Reynolds, 72, American rock guitarist (Black Oak Arkansas)
 Sarah Harding, 39, British pop singer (Girls Aloud)
 6 
 Sunil Perera, 68, Sri Lankan pop and baila singer (The Gypsies)
 Bennie Pete, 45, American jazz and funk sousaphonist (Hot 8 Brass Band)
 7 – Warren Storm, 84, American swamp pop singer and drummer
 8 
 Susan Anway, 70, American indie rock singer (The Magnetic Fields)
 Uno Loop, 91, Estonian estrada, pop and jazz singer, guitarist and music educator
 Pulamaipithan, 85, Indian film lyricist
 9 – Amanda Holden, 73, British classical librettist
 10 
 Michael Chapman, 80, British folk singer-songwriter and guitarist
 Rick Newell, 73, British psychedelic rock bassist (Rainbow Ffolly)
 11 – María Mendiola, 69, Spanish pop singer (Baccara)
 12 – Don Maddox, 90, American country singer (Maddox Brothers and Rose)
 13 – George Wein, 95, American jazz pianist and co-founder of the Newport Jazz Festival and Newport Folk Festival
 14 – Vicente Zarzo Pitarch, 83, Spanish classical French horn player
 15
 Norman Bailey, 88, British opera singer
 Leonard Gibbs, 73, American jazz percussionist
 16 
 Jane Powell, 92, American pop singer
 George Mraz, 77, Czech-born American jazz bassist and saxophonist (Quest, New York Jazz Quartet, The Thad Jones/Mel Lewis Orchestra)
 17 – Dottie Dodgion, 91, American jazz drummer
 19
 Sylvano Bussotti, 89, Italian classical composer
 András Ligeti, 68, Hungarian classical violinist
 Mats Paulson, 83, Swedish pop singer-songwriter
 Marina Tucaković, 67, Serbian folk and pop lyricist
 20 
 Colin Bailey, 87, British-American jazz drummer
 Sarah Dash, 76, American R&B and funk singer (Labelle)
 Claude Lombard, 76, Belgian pop singer
 Julz Sale, British post-punk singer-songwriter and guitarist (Delta 5)
 Warner Williams, 91, American blues guitarist (Little Bit A Blues)
 21 
 Richard H. Kirk, 65, British electronic and industrial multi-instrumentalist (Cabaret Voltaire, Sweet Exorcist)
 La Prieta Linda, 88, Mexican pop singer
 22 
 Bob Moore, 88, American country bassist
 Jan Stanienda, 68, Polish classical violinist
 23 – Sue Thompson, 96, American pop and country singer
 24 – Pee Wee Ellis, 80, American jazz and soul saxophonist
 25 – Patricio Manns, 84, Chilean folk singer-songwriter
 26 
 George "Commander Cody" Frayne IV, 77, American country rock singer and keyboardist (Commander Cody and His Lost Planet Airmen)
 Alan Lancaster, 72, British rock bassist (Status Quo, The Party Boys)
 27 
 Darrell Bath, British punk guitarist (The Vibrators, The Dogs D'Amour)
 Chris Ho, Singaporean new wave singer (Zircon Lounge)
 Andrea Martin, 49, American R&B singer-songwriter
 Teymur Mirzoyev, 85, Azerbaijani jazz singer (Gaya Quartet)
 28
 Nana Ampadu, 76, Ghanaian highlife singer and guitarist
 Karan Armstrong, 79, American opera soprano
 Pete Fullerton, 75, American folk rock bassist and singer (We Five)
 Phi Nhung, 49, Vietnamese-American Vọng cổ singer
 Barry Ryan, 72, British pop singer
 Lonnie Smith, 79, American jazz organist
 29
 Hayko, 48, Armenian pop singer
 Olivier Libaux, 57, French new wave and lounge guitarist (Nouvelle Vague)
 Mike Renzi, 80, American jazz pianist and composer
 30
 Lennart Åberg, 79, Swedish jazz fusion saxophonist
 Carlisle Floyd, 95, American opera composer
 Greg Gilbert, 44, British indie rock singer and guitarist (Delays)

October
 1
 Raymond Gniewek, 89, American classical violinist
 Robin Morton, 81, Irish folk singer and bodhran player (The Boys of the Lough)
 Ewert Ljusberg, 76, Swedish folk singer
 2
 John Rossall, 75, English glam rock saxophonist and trombonist (The Glitter Band)
 Sebastião Tapajós, 78, Brazilian folk guitarist
 3 – Anouman Brou Félix, 86, Ivorian attie multi-instrumentalist
 5 – Pat Fish, 64, British indie pop singer and guitarist (The Jazz Butcher)
 8 
 Everett Morton, 71, Kittian-British ska drummer (The Beat)
 Jim Pembroke, 65, British-Finnish progressive rock singer (Wigwam, Blues Section)
 Jem Targal, 74, American psychedelic rock bassist (Third Power)
 9 – Dee Pop, 65, American post-punk drummer (Bush Tetras, The Gun Club)
 10 – Luis de Pablo, 91, Spanish classical composer
 11
 Misko Barbara, 49, Ukrainian rock singer (Dead Rooster)
 Deon Estus, 65, American R&B bassist and singer
 12 – Paddy Moloney, 83, Irish Celtic folk multi-instrumentalist (The Chieftains, Ceoltóirí Chualann)
 13 – Andrea Haugen, 45, German heavy metal singer
 14
 Emani 22, 22, American R&B singer
 Phil Leadbetter, 59, American bluegrass resonator guitarist
 Tom Morey, 86, American jazz drummer
 15 – Regi Hargis, 70, American funk guitarist and singer (Brick)
 16 
 Tom Gray, 70, American new wave and blues rock singer-songwriter and keyboardist (The Brains, Delta Moon)
 Ron Tutt, 83, American rock drummer (TCB Band, Jerry Garcia Band)
 17 – Bruce Gaston, 74, American Thai classical multi-instrumentalist
 18
 Franco Cerri, 95, Italian jazz guitarist and bassist
 Edita Gruberová, 74, Slovak opera singer
 19 – Leslie Bricusse, 90, British film and theater composer and lyricist
 21
 Tommy DeBarge, 64, American R&B-funk bassist and singer (Switch)
 Dmitriy Galitsky, 65, Russian pop singer and keyboardist (Sinyaya Ptitsa)
 Bernard Haitink, 92, Dutch classical conductor and violinist
 Sergei Krinitzin, 65, Russian progressive rock drummer (Autograph)
 Robin McNamara, 74, American pop rock singer-songwriter
 Allan Wilmot, 96, Jamaican-born British pop singer (The Southlanders)
 22
 Jay Black, 82, American pop-rock singer (Jay and the Americans)
 Udo Zimmermann, 78, German opera and classical composer and conductor
 24 
 Willie Cobbs, 89, American blues singer and harmonica player
 Sonny Osborne, 83, American bluegrass banjoist (Osborne Brothers) 
 25 – Alfredo Diez Nieto, 103, Cuban classical composer and conductor
 26 – Rose Lee Maphis, 98, American country singer
 27 
 Letieres Leite, 61, Brazilian afro-jazz composer and conductor (Orkestra Rumpilezz)
 William Shelby, 65, American funk keyboardist (Lakeside, Dynasty)
 Benjamin Vallé, 47, Swedish post-punk guitarist (Viagra Boys)
 28 – Raša Đelmaš, 71, Serbian progressive rock drummer (YU Grupa, Zebra, Pop Mašina)
 30 – Fan Tsai, 26, Taiwanese indie rock drummer (No Party for Cao Dong)

November
 1
 Emmett Chapman, 85, American jazz guitarist and inventor of the Chapman Stick
 Nelson Freire, 77, Brazilian classical pianist
 Gilberto Grácio, 85, Portuguese luthier
 Pat Martino, 77, American jazz guitarist
 2 
 Sabah Fakhri, 88, Syrian Muwashshah and Qudud Halabiya singer
 Declan Mulligan, 83, Irish-born American rock guitarist and bassist (The Beau Brummels)
 Ernest Wilson, 69, Jamaican reggae singer (The Clarendonians)
 Ronnie Wilson, 73, American funk multi-instrumentalist (The Gap Band)
 3 – Georgie Dann, 81, French pop singer
 4 – Mario Lavista, 78, Mexican film composer
 5 – Marília Mendonça, 26, Brazilian sertanejo singer-songwriter
 6
 Astro, 64, British reggae singer and percussionist (UB40)
 Andy Barker, 53, British acid house keyboardist and bassist (808 State)
 Barry Coope, English folk singer (Coope Boyes and Simpson)
 Marinko Rokvić, 67, Bosnian folk singer
 7
 Clifford Grant, 91, Australian opera singer
 Bopol Mansiamina, 72, Congolese soukous guitarist (Les Quatre Étoiles)
 8 – Margo Guryan, 84, American pop singer-songwriter
 10 
 Mike “Bones” Gersema, American hard drummer (L.A. Guns)
 John Kinsella, 81, Irish classical composer
 Miroslav Žbirka, 69, Slovak rock singer (Modus)
 11 
 Graeme Edge, 80, British progressive rock drummer (The Moody Blues)
 Mark Gillespie, Australian pop singer-songwriter
 John Goodsall, 68, American-British progressive rock and jazz fusion guitarist (Brand X, Atomic Rooster)
 13 – Philip Margo, 79, American doo-wop singer (The Tokens)
 15 – Heber Bartolome, 73, Filipino folk singer
 16 – Belinda Sykes, 55, British medieval folk singer and multi-instrumentalist (Joglaresa)
 17 
 Keith Allison, 79, American garage rock bassist (Paul Revere & the Raiders)
 Dave Frishberg, 88, American jazz pianist and songwriter
 Theuns Jordaan, 50, South African blues singer-songwriter
 Young Dolph, 36, American rapper
 18 
 Slide Hampton, 89, American jazz trombonist
 Ack van Rooyen, 91, Dutch jazz trumpeter and flugelhornist
 19
 Hank von Hell, 49, Norwegian punk singer (Turbonegro)
 David Longdon, 56, British progressive rock singer and multi-instrumentalist (Big Big Train)
 20
 Jim Gallagher, 78, American surf rock drummer (The Astronauts)
 Billy Hinsche, 70, American pop singer, guitarist and keyboardist (Dino, Desi & Billy)
 Merima Njegomir, 68, Serbian sevdah singer
 21 
 Yul Anderson, 63, American blues and gospel singer, guitarist and pianist
 Gurmeet Bawa, 77, Indian folk singer
 Gordon Crosse, 83, British classical composer
 22 
 Joanne Shenandoah, 63, American folk singer-songwriter and guitarist
 Asya Sultanova, 98, Azerbaijani classical composer
 23 – Tatyana Chudova, 77, Russian classical composer
 24
 Mārtiņš Brauns, 70, Latvian pop and theater composer and multi-instrumentalist
 Marilyn McLeod, 82, American R&B singer-songwriter
 Gared O'Donnell, 44, American post-hardcore singer and guitarist (Planes Mistaken for Stars)
 26 – Stephen Sondheim, 91, American film and theater composer and lyricist
 28
 Alexander Gradsky, 72, Russian rock singer and composer
 Laila Halme, 87, Finnish pop singer
 Meñique, 87, Panamanian salsa singer
30 
 Sirivennela Seetharama Sastry, 66, Indian film and theatre lyricist and singer
 Martin Wright, British alternative rock guitarist (Intastella)

December
 1
 Grand Jojo, 85, Belgian pop singer
 Alvin Lucier, 90, American experimental composer and sound artist
 2 – Abdel Karim al Kabli, 89, Sudanese folk singer and oud player
 4 
 Thoppil Anto, 81, Indian playback singer
 Stonewall Jackson, 89, American country music singer
 5 
 John Miles, 72, British progressive rock singer-songwriter
 Toni Santagata, 85, Italian folk singer
 Bill Staines, 74, American folk singer-songwriter
 6 – János Kóbor, 78, Hungarian progressive rock singer (Omega)
 7
 Steve Bronski, 61, Scottish new wave keyboardist (Bronski Beat)
 DJ Scholar, British grime rapper (Ruff Sqwad)
 Greg Tate, 63, American multi-genre guitarist (Burnt Sugar) and music critic
 8
 Gil Bridges, 80, American rock saxophonist (Rare Earth)
 Barry Harris, 91, American jazz pianist
 Chandidas Mal, 92, Indian classical singer
 Robbie Shakespeare, 68, Jamaican reggae bassist (Sly and Robbie) and record producer
 Ralph Tavares, 79, American R&B singer (Tavares)
 9 – David Lasley, 74, American pop and R&B singer
 10
 Les Emmerson, 77, Canadian rock singer-songwriter and guitarist (Five Man Electrical Band)
 Mensi, British punk rock singer (Angelic Upstarts)
 Michael Nesmith, 78, American rock and country singer, songwriter and guitarist (The Monkees, The First National Band)
 11 – Garth Dennis, 72, Jamaican reggae singer (Black Uhuru, The Wailing Souls)
 12 – Vicente Fernández, 81, Mexican ranchera singer
 13 
 Joe Simon, 85, American R&B and soul singer
 Toby Slater, 42, British indie pop singer-songwriter (Catch)
 14 – Phil Chen, 81, Jamaican rock and reggae bassist (Manzarek–Krieger, Butts Band)
 15
 Francisco Kröpfl, 90, Argentine classical composer
 Wanda Young, 78, American R&B singer (The Marvelettes)
 16
 Hub, 62, American hip hop bassist (The Roots)
 Terry Uttley, 70, British rock bassist (Smokie) 
 Ian Worang, 47, Canadian indie rock singer and guitarist (Uncut)
 17
 John Morgan, 80, English Scrumpy and Western drummer (The Wurzels)
 Weerasak Sunthornsri, 71, Thai folk rock guitarist (Caravan)
 Lindsay Tebbutt, Australian pub rock drummer (The Choirboys)
 18 
 Custom, 54, Canadian alternative rock singer-songwriter
 Tam Harvey, Scottish folk guitarist (The Humblebums)
 Kangol Kid, 55, American rapper (UTFO)
 Renée Martel, 74, Canadian country singer
 19 
 Billy Conway, 66, American blues rock and alternative rock drummer (Morphine, Treat Her Right)
 Drakeo the Ruler, 28, American rapper
 Carlos Marín, 53, Spanish classical crossover singer (Il Divo)
 20 – Paul Mitchell, American R&B singer (The Floaters)
 21 – Anthony Williams, 90, Trinidadian steelband steel pan player
 23
 Robin Le Mesurier, 68, British rock guitarist
 Emil Ramsauer, 103, Swiss pop bassist (Takasa)
 24 
 J. D. Crowe, 84, American bluegrass banjo player (New South)
 Marco Mathieu, 57, Italian hardcore punk bassist (Negazione)
 Meor Aziddin Yusof, 54, Malaysian folk singer-songwriter
 25 – Tiffini Hale, 46, American pop singer (The Party)
 27 – Victor Socaciu, 68, Romanian folk singer and composer
 29 
 Paolo Giordano, 59, Italian classical guitarist
 Peter Klatzow, 76, German classical composer and pianist
 30 – Stephen J. Lawrence, 82, American television composer
 31 
 Juraj Filas, 66, Serbian classical composer
 Ivan Mozgovenko, 97, Russian classical clarinetist

See also

Timeline of musical events
Women in Music
Impact of the COVID-19 pandemic on the music industry

References

 
2021-related lists
Music by year
Music
Culture-related timelines by year